Khaled Radwan (born 2 October 1990) is a Qatari-Syrian footballer. He currently plays for Al-Khor.
He is the son of former Syrian footballer Radwan Al-Sheikh Hassan
.

External links

References

Qatari footballers
1990 births
Living people
Lekhwiya SC players
Al Kharaitiyat SC players
Al-Duhail SC players
Al-Khor SC players
Al-Shahania SC players
Qatari people of Syrian descent
Syrian Kurdish people
Naturalised citizens of Qatar
Qatar Stars League players
Qatari Second Division players
Association football defenders